Juan Francisco Escobar (born January 31, 1949) is a former Paraguayan football referee. 

A former FIFA referee, Escobar supervised matches during the 1985 FIFA World Youth Championship, the 1992 Olympic tournament, and the 1991 and 1993 Copa América tournaments. He also served as a referee in qualifying matches for the 1986 and 1994 World Cups.

References

Profile

1949 births
Living people
Paraguayan football referees
Copa América referees
Olympic football referees